The Sogeram languages are a family of languages in the Madang stock of New Guinea. They are named after the Sogeram River.

In earlier classifications, such as that of Wurm, most of the Sogeram family were called "Wanang", after the Wanang River. The exceptions were Faita, placed as a separate branch of the Southern Adelbert languages, and Mum–Sirva (then called the "Sikan" family), which were classified with the other branch, Josephstaal (Tomul River).

Languages
Daniels (2016) classifies the Sogeram languages in three branches, including some recently documented languages.

Sogeram
West Sogeram
Mand
Nend
Central Segeram
Manat
Apalɨ
North Central Sogeram (Sikan): Mum, Sirva
"East" Sogeram
Gants
Kursav
Aisian: Magɨ, Aisi

Daniels (2017), following Pawley, resolves the issue of Gants by classifying it as East Sogeram, closest to Kursav though he refrains from claiming the two languages form a clade. He notes that the name "East Sogeram" is no longer geographically appropriate, as Gants would be the westernmost Sogeram language.

Recently discovered Magɨyi may also be a Sogeram language, with the forms of identified cognates closest to Mum.

Because these languages form a chain, where each influences its neighbors, the branching of the family is not clear. Usher divides the languages in nearly the same way, differing only in the placement of Manat:

 Sogeram River 
West Sogeram River
Atemple–Nend: Atemble (Atemple, Mand), Nend (Angaua)
Paynamar (Manat)
Central Sogeram River
Apali (Emerum)
 Mum–Sirva: Mum (Katiati), Sileibi (Sirva)
South Sogeram River
Faita (Kulsab/Kursav)
Gants
Musak (Aisi)

Names
Below are Sogeram language names in Daniels (2015) compared to names listed in Z'graggen (1975), along with their respective meanings.

Proto-language

A phonological reconstruction of Proto-Sogeram has been proposed by Daniels (2015).

Phonology
Proto-Sogeram phonemic inventory according to Daniels (2015):

Pronouns
Daniels (2017) reconstructs the pronouns as follows:

Compare Ross's proto-Madang singular pronouns *ya, *na, *nu/*ua.

Lexicon
Selected lexical reconstructions from Daniels (2015) are listed below.

Comparisons
The following is a comparative table of reconstructed forms in Proto-Sogeram and Proto-Northern Adelbert.

References

Further reading

Daniels, Don. 2010. A preliminary phonological history of the Sogeram languages of Papua New Guinea. Oceanic Linguistics 49(1), 163–193.
Daniels, Don. 2015. A Reconstruction of Proto-Sogeram Phonology, Lexicon, and Morphosyntax. Doctoral dissertation. University of California, Santa Barbara.
Daniels, Don. 2020. Grammatical reconstruction: The Sogeram languages of New Guinea. Berlin/Boston: De Gruyter.

Online word lists
Proto-Sogeram. TransNewGuinea.org. From Daniels, D. 2010. A preliminary phonological history of the Sogeram languages of Papua New Guinea. Oceanic Linguistics, 49, 163-193.
Proto-Central-Sogeram. TransNewGuinea.org. From Daniels, D. 2010. A preliminary phonological history of the Sogeram languages of Papua New Guinea. Oceanic Linguistics, 49, 163-193.
Proto-Eastern-Sogeram. TransNewGuinea.org. From Daniels, D. 2010. A preliminary phonological history of the Sogeram languages of Papua New Guinea. Oceanic Linguistics, 49, 163-193.
Proto-Western-Sogeram. TransNewGuinea.org. From Daniels, D. 2010. A preliminary phonological history of the Sogeram languages of Papua New Guinea. Oceanic Linguistics, 49, 163-193.

 
Southern Adelbert languages